Richard Hill (12 August 1861 — 25 December 1924) was an English cricketer. He was a right-handed batsman and left-arm fast bowler who played for Somerset. He was born in Timsbury and died in Westminster.

Hill made a single first-class appearance for the team during the 1882 season, against Gloucestershire. From the lower order, he scored a duck in the first innings in which he batted and 7 not out in the second, his first-innings wicket falling courtesy of W. G. Grace.

Hill bowled eight overs during the match, capturing one wicket, that of onetime Test player James Cranston.

Hill's brother, Francis, made a single first-class appearance for Somerset during the 1882 season.

External links
Richard Hill at CricketArchive 

1861 births
1924 deaths
English cricketers
Somerset cricketers
People from Timsbury, Somerset